John R. Vivyan (née Vukayan; May 31, 1915 – December 20, 1983) was an American stage and television actor, who was best known for portraying the title character in the television series Mr. Lucky.

Early life
John Vivyan was born in Pittsburgh, Pennsylvania, apparently to parents of Serbian background. There is very little information about his family or early life prior to his military service.

According to a later interview, his family moved to Chicago when he was still an infant. He attended the Serbian Orthodox Church on Schiller Street as a boy, where he sang in the choir. After a year at Lake View High School, he dropped out to start work. He was employed by the Continental Can Company in Chicago during October 1940, when he registered for the draft as John Vukayan. The Draft Registrar recorded him as being 6'3" and weighing 185 pounds, with brown eyes and hair, and a scar on his forehead.

Military service
Two months before his 26th birthday, on April 8, 1941, he enlisted in the US Army. His enlistment papers carried the name "John R. Vukayan", and noted he was a citizen, single, had completed one year of high school, and was semi-skilled in metal working. He was assigned to the 132nd Infantry Regiment (Illinois National Guard), which deployed overseas to Australia in January 1942. From there his regiment moved to New Caledonia in March 1942, eventually forming part of the Americal Division. His regiment was sent to take part in the Battle of Guadalcanal on December 8, 1942, and within a week was engaged in fighting off Japanese infiltrators. John was a corporal with Company E of the 2nd Battalion, which was thrown into the Battle for Mt Austen on January 2, 1943. The battalion suffered heavy casualties during the fighting, one of whom was John, his left leg hit by gunfire.

Evacuated from the Solomon Islands on January 6, 1943, he would spend the next fourteen months in Army hospitals recovering from his wounds. He later recounted that the Army doctors had several times considered amputating the leg.  He was eventually moved stateside to a hospital in Michigan, where he recalled meeting actress Loretta Young when she visited wounded soldiers. Awarded a Purple Heart and Bronze Star he was judged unfit for further active service and was discharged from the Army on March 23, 1944. The injury to his left leg would continue to bother him and limit his physical activity for years to come.

Early stage career
While pondering his career options during his long convalescence, John became interested in the theater. In June 1946 he starts appearing as "John Vivyan" among the cast of the Barter Theatre group's junior company, at the "Barter Colony" near Abingdon, Virginia. The circumstances of his stage name's adoption are not known, and from later sources it is apparent he retained "John R. Vukayan" as his legal name until at least 1960.

The Barter Theatre provided free room and board for prospective actors but no pay. When not performing, they were expected to help out with sets, lighting, and costumes, as well as work in the lodging and cafeteria used by the troupe. It was a lifestyle that appealed to many recently discharged veterans, thirty-six of whom, including Vivyan, were inducted into the American Legion at a ceremony in July 1946. Performances had short runs, often no more than two evenings and a matinee. At the time, the Barter Theatre group had no venue of its own, so plays were performed at the Municipal Theatre in nearby Abingdon. The Barter Theatre performers also entertained at local social clubs; Vivyan sang Serbian folk songs at one such event.

Vivyan finished out his time with the Barter Theatre group during a 1946-47 winter tour of Virginia and South Carolina, in which the troupe alternated the plays Arms and the Man and Much Ado About Nothing.

Summer stock and New York television
In 1947, Vivyan moved to Manhattan. He used his G.I. Bill money to pay for lessons at the American Academy of Dramatic Arts there.  After graduating, however, he was unable to find any acting jobs. He later told an interviewer that this was a grim period in his life. He scraped by on doing summer stock theatre, performing work disdained by established actors for its low pay and grueling pace.

He also found work in the new television industry, doing a couple of minor roles each year from 1949 thru 1954. New York City was a creative center for early live television, particularly anthology series, which featured a new story and cast with each episode. Film actors disliked the pressure of performing live, so an out of work stage actor had an advantage.

After years of near obscurity, Vivyan caught a break in 1952. He was cast opposite June Havoc in a summer touring company production of W. Somerset Maugham's Rain. This two-month tour provided Vivyan with the time to hone his portrayal of the unfortunate Rev. Davidson, drawing good reviews in several cities. He followed this success with a late summer engagement in a Noël Coward play, On Approval, with the popular Arthur Treacher casting reflected glory on his younger co-star.

Following those off-season successes, Vivyan landed a role in a high season production of a recent Broadway musical. Joan Blondell was the star of a multi-city tour for A Tree Grows in Brooklyn, with Vivyan playing her romantic interest. The tour opened in Bridgeport, went to Boston and Washington, D. C., before finishing in Chicago. At the latter, the local paper noted he attended services and sang with the choir at the same Serbian Orthodox Church to which he belonged growing up.

The following years were less successful. Vivyan had only a few weeks acting during August 1953 with the musical Lady in the Dark, performed al fresco at Pitt Stadium, which starred Billie Worth and included Lee Bergere and a young Shirley Jones among the cast. This was followed by an even quicker stint in a new play about the United Nations, called The Paradise Question. Starring Leon Ames, the show lasted only two weeks in New Haven, Connecticut and Philadelphia.

West Coast television
From 1954 to 1956, Vivyan did a few television shows on the West Coast, even as his New York television work seemed to slow down. He also had an uncredited role in his first film, a Hitchcock docudrama called The Wrong Man. He still traveled between the coasts for stage work, but that ceased with 1957, when he did episodes of eight television shows in Hollywood, followed by eight more in 1958. From then on, he resided permanently in Southern California.

Where his stage roles had largely seen him play lovers, his television roles were at first as victims and then heavies. By 1959 his schedule was filled with TV roles, on a dozen different series, with many featuring multiple appearances. He also did a second film, Imitation of Life, before being cast as the star in a new Blake Edwards series.

He thrived on the fast pace and handling different characters, but faced a physical challenge with the many Western shows he was doing. He had no prior experience at riding a horse, and the necessity for a rider's left leg being the focal point for mounting and dismounting limited his ability to do so. More than one producer solved the problem by putting his character into a horse-drawn buggy instead.

Mr. Lucky

Producer Blake Edwards had a hit with his unconventional TV detective show Peter Gunn in 1958–59, and decided to create another show around an equally unlikely protagonist. For the 1959-60 television season he sold CBS and two sponsors on Mr. Lucky, a professional gambler who helped out others. As with Peter Gunn actor Craig Stevens, Vivyan was cast by Edwards for the way his appearance and style suggested film star Cary Grant. Edwards even took both lead actors to his own tailor, to ensure their clothes projected a debonair style. Vivyan's own comment to an interviewer was "Nobody said I looked like Grant before this series".

The show was an immediate success, helped considerably by the Henry Mancini theme music and the presence of actor Ross Martin as "Andamo", Mr. Lucky's sidekick. Mr. Lucky had his gambling operation on a yacht called Fortuna II, anchored just beyond the then 3 mile legal limit for a major California port. Tom Brown played "Lt. Rovacs", a police officer who was grudgingly helpful to Mr. Lucky and Andamo.

Pippa Scott played a recurring character who served as Mr Lucky's occasional love interest. Off-camera, she reportedly called John Vivyan "Vookie", as a teasing reference to his real last name and the then popular character of "Kookie" on 77 Sunset Strip. The real name of the character Mr. Lucky was never heard during the series, though a CBS network press release announcing a mid-season format change identified it as "Lucky Santell".

The show used a former Las Vegas casino dealer named Joe Scott as the technical advisor for gambling. He also played a dealer on the Fortuna II then its maitre d' after the casino yacht was converted to a restaurant.

Despite critical acclaim and high ratings, Mr. Lucky was cancelled by CBS. Newspaper columnists offered several possible reasons, and for a while there was an effort by the producers to sell the show to other networks, but to no avail. Thus, Vivyan's fall from fame was almost as fast as his rise.

Later career and life
Vivyan once complained to a columnist that being on CBS limited the guest spots he could accept for that network's own shows. Having gone through lean periods, he was inclined to pursue performing opportunities whenever they arose. Following the cancellation of Mr. Lucky, he resumed doing stage work in between television shows. He also did another film, Rider on a Dead Horse (1962), and voice-over work for an animated short in 1963. He had a brief recurring role as the gangster Lepke Buchalter on The Lawless Years, but most of his other television work was for single appearances. These tapered off quickly to two or three shows a year, then became more infrequent after Vivyan turned fifty in 1965. His stage work also ceased about the same time.

He did no performing work for seven years after open heart surgery, at age sixty, in 1975. He resumed doing television in 1982, appearing on commercials and an episode each of two popular shows, WKRP in Cincinnati and Simon & Simon. The latter show was broadcast just two weeks before he died of heart failure at Santa Monica Hospital on December 20, 1983.

Personal life
Vivyan told a newspaper columnist that he had tried marriage once, but it did not work out. There is no readily-available public record of his marriage, and he continued to be regarded as an eligible bachelor while active in show business. During 1958 he dated Ellen Powell, the daughter of Joan Blondell and Dick Powell. Later, he was said to occasionally date actress Nita Talbot among others.

According to newspapers, he owned a cabin cruiser which he used for deep sea fishing. He lived in a modest apartment on Sweetzer Avenue in West Hollywood during most of his peak popularity. His main hobby was woodworking, and hand restoring old furniture that he would buy from second-hand shops. He told an interviewer that he had not gambled since his Army days as "I get no kicks out of it".

Stage performances

Filmography

References

American male stage actors
American male television actors
1915 births
1983 deaths
Male actors from Pittsburgh
20th-century American male actors
United States Army personnel of World War II
United States Army non-commissioned officers